Bhaguwal  is a village in Kapurthala district of Punjab State, India. The village is administrated by a Sarpanch, who is an elected representative.

Demography 
According to the report published by Census India in 2011, Bhaguwal has a total number of 103 houses and population of 575 of which include 292 males and 283 females. Literacy rate of Bhaguwal is  56.43%, lower than state average of 75.84%.  The population of children under the age of 6 years is 93 which is  16.17% of total population of Bhaguwal, and child sex ratio is approximately  1214, higher than state average of 846.

Population data

Air travel connectivity 
The closest airport to the village is Sri Guru Ram Dass Jee International Airport.

Villages in Kapurthala

External links
  Villages in Kapurthala
 Kapurthala Villages List

References

Villages in Kapurthala district